The Icon of the Triumph of Orthodoxy (also known as the Icon of the Sunday of Orthodoxy) is the festal icon for the first Sunday of Great Lent, a celebration that commemorated the end of Byzantine Iconoclasm and restoration of icons to the church in 843 (the eponymous "Triumph of Orthodoxy"), and which remains a church feast in Orthodoxy.  It is the earliest known depiction of this subject, and thought to have been painted in Constantinople, capital of the Byzantine Empire.  It was purchased by the British Museum in 1988. The dimensions of the icon are: height: 37.8 cm, width: 31.4 cm, depth: 5.3 cm.

Composition
Painted in egg tempera on gold leaf over a wooden panel covered with gesso and linen in the late 14th century, its focal point is the famous icon, here intended to be understood as the physical icon itself, the Virgin Hodegetria, which was commonly believed to have been created by St Luke.

The Hodegetria is being held up by two angels while to the left stand Empress Theodora and her son Michael III, who were responsible for ending Iconoclasm in 843. To the right of the Hodegetria are Patriarch Methodios, Bishop Theodore and two monks. Beneath them are 11 saints and martyrs. Just below the Hodegetria are Theophanes the Confessor and Theodore the Studite jointly holding an image of Christ. To the far left is Saint Theodosia, the only female saint, holding an icon of Christ-Emmanuel. She is depicted wearing a skepe, a veil with a squarish top, typical of Byzantine nuns. The fourth figure from the left, right behind Theophanes the Confessor, is identified as Saint Ioannikios. On the right, behind Theodore the Studite, stands a bishop identified by his garb while right behind him stand the brothers Theodorus and Theophanes Graptoi. The last two figures are identified as Saint Theophylaktos and Arsakios. Though they are all depicted together, many of them were not contemporaries.

References

Further reading

Evans, Helen C. (ed.), Byzantium, Faith and Power (1261–1557), # 78, 2004, Metropolitan Museum of Art/Yale University Press, Fully online from the Metropolitan Museum of Art

External links
 BBC: A History of the World in 100 Objects
 Passage on icon from Robin Cormack, Icons (2007)
 British Museum Collection Online entry

Byzantine Iconoclasm
Byzantine icons
14th-century paintings
Medieval European objects in the British Museum
Paintings of the Madonna and Child